Maman is a 2012 French drama directed by Alexandra Leclère.

Plot
Alice and Sandrine are sisters. One is married to Serge, realtor, and offers piano lessons to occupy his time. The second has two sons, Thomas and Nicolas, works in an advertising agency and occasionally sleeping with the director, Erwan. These two women with established routine will suddenly be confronted with a violent imponderable: their mother arrived from Lyon, with the intention of moving to Paris after a stormy divorce. This same mother who had leaked 20 years ago, this mother not love that had never occupied them and had never tried to contact them. The reunion, tumultuous, pushing Alice and Sandrine to strike a blow: they are absorbed sleeping pills to their mother they kidnap and sequester the house of Erwan, Brittany. With a very clear objective: to settle their accounts, and require that mother unworthy and odious to love them.

Cast

 Josiane Balasko as Paulette
 Mathilde Seigner as Sandrine
 Marina Foïs as Alice
 Michel Vuillermoz as Erwan de Kerdoec
 Serge Hazanavicius as Serge
 Thomas Gérard as Thomas
 Mathieu Rousseau as Nicolas
 Kojiro Okada as pianist

References

External links

2012 films
2012 drama films
French drama films
2010s French-language films
Les Films du Worso films
2010s French films